The West Indies cricket team toured New Zealand in December 2017 and January 2018 to play two Tests, three One Day Internationals (ODIs) and three Twenty20 International (T20I) matches. Three Tests were originally planned, but it was reduced to two by New Zealand Cricket (NZC) to conform to the expected tour make-up when the ICC World Test Championship is implemented. Ahead of the Test series, a three-day tour match was planned, which started on 25 November 2017.

New Zealand won the Test series 2–0 and the ODI series 3–0. New Zealand also won the T20I series 2–0, after the second match was washed out with no result possible. It was the first time since January 2000 that the West Indies failed to win a single match during a tour to New Zealand. With the 2–0 victory in the T20I series, New Zealand returned to the top of the ICC T20I Championship.

Squads

Ahead of the first Test, Tom Blundell and Lockie Ferguson were added to New Zealand's squad as cover for BJ Watling and Tim Southee respectively. George Worker was added to New Zealand's squad ahead of the first test after Tim Southee was ruled out due to a family reason. Southee returned for the second Test, following the birth of his child. The West Indies captain Jason Holder was suspended for the second Test, after maintaining a slow over-rate. Kraigg Brathwaite was named as the captain of the West Indies for the second Test in Holder's absence.

For New Zealand, Kane Williamson and Tim Southee were selected only for the first ODI with Neil Broom and Mitchell Santner replacing them for the last two ODIs. Tom Latham was named as captain for the last two ODIs. Sunil Ambris was ruled out of the West Indies' squad for the ODI series, after sustaining a fracture of the left forearm on the final day of the second Test. Colin de Grandhomme was ruled out of New Zealand's ODI squad due to a family reason and was replaced by Doug Bracewell.

Ahead of the limited-overs fixtures, Marlon Samuels, Sunil Narine and Alzarri Joseph were all ruled out of the West Indies' squad. Sheldon Cottrell and Chadwick Walton replaced Samuels and Joseph respectively in the ODI squad. Shimron Hetmyer was also named as Sunil Ambris' replacement for the ODIs following his injury in the second Test. Shai Hope replaced Samuels in the T20I squad, while Ashley Nurse replaced Narine.

Adam Milne injured his foot ahead of the second ODI and was replaced by Seth Rance in New Zealand's squad. Tim Southee was named as New Zealand's captain for the first T20I with Kane Williamson captaining the side for the last two matches. Ross Taylor was selected for the first T20I only while Trent Boult was selected for the third T20I only.

Prior to the T20I series, Kieron Pollard withdrew from the West Indies' squad due to personal reasons and was replaced by Shimron Hetmyer. Ronsford Beaton was also unavailable for the West Indies due to an injury and was replaced by Sheldon Cottrell.

Tour matches

Three-day match: New Zealand A vs West Indies

One-day match: New Zealand XI vs West Indies

Test series

1st Test

2nd Test

ODI series

1st ODI

2nd ODI

3rd ODI

T20I series

1st T20I

2nd T20I

3rd T20I

Notes

References

External links
 Series home at ESPN Cricinfo

2017 in West Indian cricket
2017 in New Zealand cricket
International cricket competitions in 2017–18
West Indian cricket tours of New Zealand